Arbor vitae  may refer to:

Anatomy
 Arbor vitae (anatomy), white matter of the cerebellum
 arbor vitæ uteri, a part of the canal of the cervix

Places
 Arbor Vitae, Wisconsin, a town, United States
 Arbor Vitae (community), Wisconsin, an unincorporated community, United States

Other uses
 Arborvitae, Thuja, a genus of coniferous trees in the cypress family
 Arbor Vitae, an album by the band J Church

See also
Tree of life (disambiguation)